Coleophora minutula is a moth of the family Coleophoridae.

References

minutula
Moths described in 1994